Caustis deserti, commonly known as desert twig-rush, is a sedge that is native to a small area in the Goldfields-Esperance region of Western Australia to the east of Kalgoorlie.

References

Plants described in 2015
Flora of Western Australia
deserti
Taxa named by Russell Lindsay Barrett